St Michael's Church is the parish church of Penrhoslligwy, a village near Moelfre in the north-east of the island of Anglesey, in Gwynedd, Wales. With datable components from around 1400, the building is listed at Grade II* and was restored in 1865. (Penrhoslligwy is also sometimes written Penrhos Lligwy or Penrhos-Lligwy; the spelling Penrhoslligwy is used by the Church in Wales.)

References

External list
 

15th-century church buildings in Wales
Grade II* listed churches in Anglesey